Krishnaraj Sriram (15 November 1973 – 16 February 2017) was an Indian cricketer. He played fifteen first-class matches for Karnataka between 1995 and 2000. He died from a cardiac arrest in Bangalore on 16 February 2017, aged 43.

References

External links
 

1973 births
2017 deaths
Indian cricketers
Karnataka cricketers
Sportspeople from Madurai
Cricketers from Tamil Nadu